This is a list of songs that topped the Belgian Walloon (francophone) Ultratop 40 in 1995.

See also
1995 in music

References

External links
 Ultratop 40

1995 in Belgium
1995 record charts
1995